Basye is a census-designated place (CDP) in Shenandoah County, Virginia, United States. The population was 1,374 at the 2020 census. As of the 2000 census, the CDP was known as Basye-Bryce Mountain.

History 
Basye was named after a local family that lived in the area and whose cemetery remains off one of the holes on the golf course. Originally considered part of the Orkney Springs community, Basye was named by Martha Basye, married to William Brice, who opened the original resort.  One of the early settlers seems to have been John Basye (born 1773 died 1856).

Geography
Basye is located at  (38.818702, −78.763146).

According to the United States Census Bureau, the CDP has a total area of 8.8 square miles (22.8 km2), of which 8.7 square miles (22.5 km2) is land and 0.2 square miles (0.3 km2) (1.05%) is water.

Demographics
At the 2020 census, there were 1,374 people and 491 households residing in the CDP. There were 1,498 housing units. The racial makeup of the CDP was 92.4% White, 0.8% African American, 0.6% Native American, 0.3% Asian, 0.9% from other races, and 5.0% from two or more races. Hispanic or Latino of any race were 5.1% of the population.

Of the 491 households, 58.5% were married couples living together, 22.2% had a female householder with no spouse present, and 12.4% had a male householder with no spouse present. 28.1% of the population were never-married individuals.

8.0% of the population were under the age of 5, 12.9% were under 18 years, 87.1% were 18 years and over, and 22.9% were 65 years of age or older. The median age was 47.1 years.

The median household income was $90,125 and the median family income was $106,250. Married-couple families had a median income of $110,417 versus $52,888 for nonfamily households. About 7.5% of the population were below the poverty line, including 45.8% of those under age 18, 2.5% of those 18 to 64, and none of those 65 years and over.

Bryce Resort

Bryce Resort is the core of Basye, a resort with six ski slopes, a small lake with a man-made beach, an 18 hole par 71 golf course and a mountain bike trail.  Bryce offers activities such as tubing and skiing in winter, swimming, tennis, grass skiing in the summer. The resort has opened a downhill mountain bike course. There is also a small aircraft landing strip on the site.

Bryce Resort occupies 400 acres and was first opened in 1909, owned by William Brice who opened Bryce’s Hillside Cottages and Mineral Baths as a way to catch the overflow of guests from nearby historic Orkney Springs Hotel. The name of the resort included a "y" instead of "i" in Bryce since William Brice reportedly wanted the business to have a different spelling than his last name. The early resort was rustic with hillside cottages and a dining hall, with most of the food grown on the premises. People would come to escape the city heat and take in the black sulphur spring in Basye.

William Brice's son Pete and his wife Julie (who both adopted the Bryce spelling for their last name) began running the resort in 1947. In the 1960s they transformed the resort adding a ski slope and other amenities, selling 2,776 lots for a woodland mountain retreat aimed for the Washington, DC vacation home market.

Lake Laura 
Lake Laura is a 44-acre pond owned by Bryce Resort. Lake Laura is formed by a dam impoundment of the headwaters of Big Stony Creek, creating a rectangular-shaped pool with a maximum depth of thirty feet.  It is open to public use and has a boat ramp for that purpose. The Virginia Department of Game and Inland Fisheries DGIF) began managing the fishery and stocking fish in the pond in 1991. The pond has one of the highest density largemouth bass populations found anywhere in Virginia. Lake Laura had a history of nuisance algal blooms and over-abundant aquatic vegetation caused by nutrient-rich sediment.

References

Census-designated places in Shenandoah County, Virginia
Census-designated places in Virginia